Fresno is a census-designated place in eastern White Eyes Township, Coshocton County, Ohio, United States. As of the 2010 census it had a population of 140. It has a post office with the ZIP code 43824, gas station, White Eyes Carryout/Drive Thru and Pizza Shop. It lies along State Route 93 between West Lafayette and Baltic.

History
Fresno was originally called Jacktown. The residents apparently didn't like the name Jacktown, and the community was renamed Avondale by popular vote. A post office was established under the name Avondale in 1875, and the name of the post office was changed to Fresno in 1905.

Notable person
World-class runner Brian Olinger grew up in Fresno and attended Ridgewood High School.

References

Census-designated places in Ohio
Census-designated places in Coshocton County, Ohio